Aldos-2-ulose dehydratase (pyranosone dehydratase, AUDH, 1,5-anhydro-D-fructose dehydratase (microthecin-forming)) is an enzyme with systematic name 1,5-anhydro-D-fructose hydro-lyase (microthecin-forming). This enzyme catalyses the following chemical reaction

 1,5-anhydro-D-fructose  2-hydroxy-2-(hydroxymethyl)-2H-pyran-3(6H)-one + H2O (overall reaction)
 (1a) 1,5-anhydro-D-fructose  1,5-anhydro-4-deoxy-D-glycero-hex-3-en-2-ulose + H2O
 (1b) 1,5-anhydro-4-deoxy-D-glycero-hex-3-en-2-ulose  2-hydroxy-2-(hydroxymethyl)-2H-pyran-3(6H)-one

This enzyme catalyses two of the steps in the anhydrofructose pathway.

References

External links 
 

EC 4.2.1